Irlian Ceka (born 3 March 1998) is an Albanian professional footballer who plays as a left-back for Albanian club KF Laçi.

Club career

Early career

Sambenedettese
On 13 July 2017 he was bought by Serie C team Sambenedettese.

KF Laçi
Ceka joined KF Laçi in January 2019, after signing a 2,5-year contract with the club.

International career
Ceka received his first international call up from the Albania national under-21 team by coach Alban Bushi for the Friendly match against France U21 on 5 June 2017 and the 2019 UEFA European Under-21 Championship qualification opening match against Estonia U21 on 12 June 2017. He made his competitive debut for Albania U21 against Estonia U21 on 12 June 2017 under coach Alban Bushi playing the full 90-minutes match to help his side to take a goalless draw. He received his first call up for the Albania under-20 side by same coach of the under-21 team Alban Bushi for the friendly match against Georgia on 14 November 2017. He debuted for under-20 team against Georgia by playing as a starter until 55th minute when he was substituted off for Marco Hoxha with score at 1–0 and the entire match finished in an eventual 3–0 loss.

Career statistics

Club

References

External links

Irlian Ceka profile Serie A TIM
 (archive)
Irlian Ceka profile at FSHF.org

1998 births
Living people
Footballers from Rome
Italian people of Albanian descent
Association football fullbacks
Albanian footballers
Albania youth international footballers
Albania under-21 international footballers
A.S. Roma players
Ascoli Calcio 1898 F.C. players
S.S. Lazio players
A.S. Sambenedettese players
KF Laçi players
KF Apolonia Fier players
Serie C players
Kategoria Superiore players
Kategoria e Parë players